Christian Dayton Clemenson (born March 17, 1958) is an American film and television actor.  He is well known for his portrayal of Jerry "Hands" Espenson in the television series Boston Legal, for which he was nominated for three Emmy Awards and won the 2006 Emmy Award for Outstanding Guest Actor in a Drama Series. He has appeared in a number of highly acclaimed films, including Hannah and Her Sisters, Broadcast News, Apollo 13 and The Big Lebowski, and portrayed Tom Burnett in Paul Greengrass' United 93. He starred in The People v. O. J. Simpson: American Crime Story as prosecutor William Hodgman.

Early life
Clemenson was born and raised in Humboldt, Iowa, the son of drug store owners Ruth Alzora (Dayton) and Ernest Arnold Clemenson. In his early teens, he delivered the Des Moines Register, which had a long tradition of awarding scholarships to top east-coast preparatory schools to a select few "paper boys." Clemenson, a straight-A junior high school student, won a Register scholarship to Phillips Academy in Andover, Massachusetts. In 1973, while Clemenson was enrolled at Phillips, his father died at age 58. He participated in many theatrical productions at Phillips Academy.

Upon graduation from Phillips in 1976, he entered Harvard College. From his freshman year onward he received important roles in campus stage productions. When Clemenson starred in a Harvard Lampoon sketch comedy show, a Harvard Crimson theater critic described Clemenson as "hugely talented actor who can trigger hysteria with any of a dozen subtle expressions or inflections." Other Crimson critics described his performances in Shakespeare plays as "a tour de force of sheer talent and intelligence" (in The Winter's Tale) and "a very fine and subtle performance" (in Measure for Measure). He displayed early on his remarkable range when he undertook with inimitable flair and hilarious effect the hugely solemn role of Erde "the green-faced torso", goddess of the Earth, in Peter Sellars's Loeb Drama Center puppet production of Wagner's Ring cycle (1979).

During many summers he would return to Humboldt to star in, and later direct, local community theater plays at Humboldt's Castle Theatre.

After graduating from Harvard College in 1980 and the Yale School of Drama in 1984, he moved to Los Angeles.

Career
Clemenson began his career in a number of character roles in film and television. He was a law student in the television version of The Paper Chase, Alex Keaton's English teacher in the television show Family Ties, a security salesman on The Golden Girls, a suspect in season 10, episode 14 of NYPD Blue, a bailiff in the Ivan Reitman movie Legal Eagles, a flight surgeon in the movie Apollo 13, a cop in The Big Lebowski, a killer in The Fisher King, and Dr. Dale Lawrence in the movie And the Band Played On. He had a regular role as Socrates Poole, a lawyer in the Old West, in the Fox series The Adventures of Brisco County, Jr.

In 1999, Clemenson appeared in the Buffy the Vampire Slayer episode "Bad Girls" as a grotesquely obese demon named Balthazar. He wore a large padded suit and extensive make-up for the role, and the character's repulsive, villainous nature contradicted many of his earlier roles.

Clemenson became well-known for his role as Jerry "Hands" Espenson on the television series Boston Legal. For playing Espenson, he won an Emmy Award for Best Guest Actor in a Drama Series in 2006 and was nominated for the same award in 2007. He remained with the series through to its finale in 2008.

Clemenson starred in the film United 93 as Tom Burnett, one of the victims of the 9/11 hijacking of the flight that crashed in rural Pennsylvania after a passenger revolt. He also had a recurring role on Veronica Mars as Abel Koontz. In total, Clemenson appeared in three episodes of the show: "Like a Virgin", "Mars vs. Mars", and "Rat Saw God". Clemenson also has appeared in a season 6 episode of NCIS, "Dead Reckoning". He also appeared in two season 2 episodes of The Mentalist. He also played Jimmy Masterson on the 3rd episode of Memphis Beat, "Love Me Tender".

In 2009, Clemenson joined CSI: Miami as the new medical examiner, Dr. Tom Loman. He appeared throughout the show's eighth, ninth, and tenth seasons as a recurring character. In 2013, he appeared as a guest star in Harry's Law.

In 2016, he played Deputy District Attorney William Hodgman in American Crime Story: The People v. O. J. Simpson.

Filmography

Film

Television

References

External links
 

1958 births
Living people
20th-century American male actors
21st-century American male actors
American male film actors
American male television actors
Male actors from Iowa
Primetime Emmy Award winners
Harvard College alumni
People from Humboldt, Iowa
Yale School of Drama alumni
Phillips Academy alumni